Patrick Jørgensen (born 31 May 1991) is a Danish épée fencer, individual bronze medallist at the 2015 World Fencing Championships.

Ranked No.102 before the competition, Jørgensen created a surprise by defeating notably Olympic silver medallists Gábor Boczkó and Bartosz Piasecki to reach the semi-finals, where he lost to World No.1 Gauthier Grumier. He came away with a bronze medal, the first significant achievement of his career and the first Danish medal in a men's event at the World Fencing Championships since Mogens Lüchow in 1950.

References

External links
 Profile at the European Fencing Confederation

Épée fencers
Danish male fencers
1991 births
Living people
Sportspeople from Copenhagen